MBK Fight Night is a Muay Thai, Kickboxing and Mixed martial arts promotions managed by MBK Center in Bangkok.

History 

The MBK Fight Night started outside the MBK Center shopping mall in 2010. Since 2012, WMO (World Muay Thai Organization) has been responsible for hosting the events and launching a live broadcast on Facebook. In 2020, mixed martial arts campaigns were added to the MBK Fight Night programs. This event, which is held in collaboration with P'N Fighter Club, held on Fridays at 18:00. One of the main goals of this MBK Fight Night is to promote Muay Thai culture and attract foreign visitors to the MBK Center. Thai fighters are compared to foreign fighters from different countries such as Myanmar, France, Iran, etc. in the open environment outside the shopping center. Watching real fights for free in the center of Bangkok is attractive for tourists. For this reason, the outdoor space of the MBK Center is usually full of spectators.

See also 

 MBK Center

References

External links 

 
 

Kickboxing in Thailand
Professional Muay Thai organizations
Muay Thai venues in Thailand
Muay Thai venues in Bangkok
Sports venues in Bangkok
Boxing venues in Thailand
2010 establishments in Thailand
Sports venues completed in 2010
Mixed martial arts organizations
Pathum Wan district